This is a list of the known varieties of snakes in South Carolina

Nonvenomous

Florida Water Snake.

Venomous 

South Carolina
Snakes